Conasprella lorenzi is a species of sea snail, a marine gastropod mollusc in the family Conidae, the cone snails and their allies.

Like all species within the genus Conasprella, these snails are predatory and venomous. They are capable of "stinging" humans, therefore live ones should be handled carefully or not at all.

Description
The size of the shell attains 27 mm.

Distribution
This species occurs in the Indian Ocean in the Mozambique Channel and off KwaZulu-Natal, South Africa.

References

 Monnier E. & Limpalaër L. (2012) Conasprella lorenzi (Gastropoda, Conidae), a new species from the Republic of South Africa. Acta Conchyliorum 11: 17–26.
  Puillandre N., Duda T.F., Meyer C., Olivera B.M. & Bouchet P. (2015). One, four or 100 genera? A new classification of the cone snails. Journal of Molluscan Studies. 81: 1–23

External links
 
 Holotype in MNHN, Paris

lorenzi
Gastropods described in 2012